A Raisin in the Sun is a play by Lorraine Hansberry that debuted on Broadway in 1959. The title comes from the poem "Harlem" (also known as "A Dream Deferred") by Langston Hughes. The story tells of a black family's experiences in south Chicago, as they attempt to improve their financial circumstances with an insurance payout following the death of the father, and deals with matters of housing discrimination, racism, and assimilation. The New York Drama Critics' Circle named it the best play of 1959, and in recent years publications such as The Independent and Time Out have listed it among the best plays ever written.

Plot
Walter and Ruth Younger, their son Travis, along with Walter's mother Lena (Mama) and Walter's younger sister Beneatha, live in poverty in a run-down two-bedroom apartment on Chicago's South Side. Walter is barely making a living as a limousine driver. Though Ruth is content with their lot, Walter is not, and desperately wishes to become wealthy. His plan is to invest in a liquor store in partnership with Willy and Bobo, his street-smart acquaintances.

At the beginning of the play, Walter Lee and Beneatha's father has recently died, and Mama (Lena) is waiting for a life insurance check for $10,000 ($101,000 in 2023). Walter has a sense of entitlement to the money, but Mama has religious objections to alcohol, and Beneatha has to remind him it is Mama's call how to spend it. Eventually, Mama puts some of the money down on a new house, choosing an all-white neighborhood over a black one for the practical reason that it is much cheaper. Later she relents and gives the remaining $6,500 to Walter to invest, with the provision that he reserve $3,000 for Beneatha's education. Walter gives all of the money to Willy, who takes it and flees, depriving Walter and Beneatha of their dreams, though not the Youngers of their new home. Bobo reports the bad news about the money. Meanwhile, Karl Lindner, a white representative of the neighborhood they plan to move to, makes an offer to buy them out. Vaguely threatening, he says he wishes to avoid tensions over the introduction of Black people into the neighborhood, which to the three women's horror Walter bitterly prepares to accept as a solution to their financial setback. Lena says that while money was something they try to work for, they should never take it if it was a person's way of telling them they were not fit to walk the same earth as them.

Meanwhile, Beneatha's character and direction in life are influenced by two different men who are potentially love interests: her wealthy and educated boyfriend George Murchison, and Joseph Asagai. Neither man is actively involved in the Youngers' financial ups and downs. George represents the "fully assimilated black man" who denies his African heritage with a "smarter than thou" attitude, which Beneatha finds disgusting, while dismissively mocking Walter's situation. Joseph, a Yoruba student from Nigeria, patiently teaches Beneatha about her African heritage; he gives her thoughtfully useful gifts from Africa while pointing out she is unwittingly assimilating herself into white ways. She straightens her hair, for example, which he characterizes as "mutilation".

When Beneatha becomes distraught at the loss of the money, she is scolded by Joseph for her materialism. She eventually accepts his point of view that things will get better with effort, along with agreeing to consider his proposal of marriage and invitation to move with him to Nigeria to practice medicine.

Walter is oblivious to the stark contrast between George and Joseph: his pursuit of wealth can be attained only by liberating himself from Joseph's culture, to which he attributes his poverty, and by rising to George's level, wherein he sees his salvation. Walter redeems himself and black pride at the end by changing his mind and not accepting the buyout offer, stating that the family is proud of who they are and will try to be good neighbors. The play closes with the family leaving for their new home but uncertain future.

The character Mrs. Johnson and a few scenes were cut from the Broadway performance and in reproductions because of time constraints. Mrs. Johnson is the Younger family's nosy and loud neighbor, at the beginning of the play. She cannot understand how the family can consider moving to a white neighborhood and cattily jokes that she will probably read in the newspaper in a month that they have been killed in a bombing. Her lines are employed as comic relief, but Hansberry also uses this scene to mock those who are too scared to stand up for their rights. In the introduction by Robert B. Nemiroff, he writes that the scene is included in print because it draws attention away from a seemingly happy ending to a more violent reality inspired by Hansberry's own experiences.

Broadway production and reception

With a cast in which all but one character is black, A Raisin in the Sun was considered a risky investment, and it took eighteen months for producer Philip Rose to raise enough money to launch it. There was disagreement with how it should be played, with the focus on the mother or on the son. When the play hit New York, Poitier played it with emphasis on the son and found not only his calling but also an audience enthralled.

After touring to positive reviews, the play premiered on Broadway at the Ethel Barrymore Theatre on March 11, 1959. It transferred to the Belasco Theatre on October 19, 1959, and closed on June 25, 1960, after 530 total performances. 
Directed by Lloyd Richards, the cast comprised:

Sidney Poitier – Walter Lee Younger
Ruby Dee – Ruth Younger
Ivan Dixon – Joseph Asagai
Lonne Elder III – Bobo
John Fiedler – Karl Lindner
Louis Gossett – George Murchison
Claudia McNeil – Lena Younger
Diana Sands – Beneatha Younger
Glynn Turman – Travis Younger
Ed Hall – moving man
Douglas Turner – moving man

Ossie Davis later took over as Walter Lee Younger, and Frances Williams as Lena Younger.

Waiting for the curtain to rise on opening night, Hansberry and producer Rose did not expect the play to be a success, for it had already received mixed reviews from a preview audience the night before. Though it won popular and critical acclaim, reviewers argued about whether the play was "universal" or particular to Black experience. It was then produced on tour.

A Raisin in the  Sun was the first play written by a Black woman to be produced on Broadway, as well as the first with a black director, Mr.  Richards.  On opening night, after multiple curtain calls, the audience cried out for the author, whereupon Poitier jumped into the audience and pulled Hansberry onto the stage for her ovation.

Hansberry noted that her play introduced details of black life to the overwhelmingly white Broadway audiences, while director Richards observed that it was the first play to which large numbers of black people were drawn. Frank Rich, writing in The New York Times in 1983, stated that A Raisin in the Sun "changed American theater forever". In 2016, Claire Brennan wrote in The Guardian that "The power and craft of the writing make A Raisin in the Sun as moving today as it was then."

In 1960 A Raisin In The Sun was nominated for four Tony Awards:

 Best Play – written by Lorraine Hansberry; produced by Philip Rose, David J. Cogan
 Best Actor in Play – Sidney Poitier
 Best Actress in a Play – Claudia McNeil 
 Best Direction of a Play – Lloyd Richards

West End production
Some five months after its Broadway opening, Hansberry's play appeared in London's West End, playing at the Adelphi Theatre from August 4, 1959. As on Broadway, the director was Lloyd Richards, and the cast was as follows:

Kim Hamilton – Ruth Younger
John Adan – Travis Younger
Earle Hyman – Walter Lee Younger
Olga James – Beneatha Younger
Juanita Moore – Lena Younger
Bari Johnson – Joseph Asagai
Scott Cunningham – George Murchison
Meredith Edwards – Karl Lindner
Lionel Ngakane – Bobo

The play was presented (as before) by Philip Rose and David J. Cogan, in association with the British impresario Jack Hylton.

1961 film 

In 1961, a film version of A Raisin in the Sun was released featuring its original Broadway cast of Sidney Poitier, Ruby Dee, Claudia McNeil, Diana Sands, Ivan Dixon, Louis Gossett Jr. and John Fiedler.  Hansberry wrote the screenplay, and the film was directed by Daniel Petrie. It was released by Columbia Pictures and Ruby Dee won the National Board of Review Award for Best Supporting Actress.  Both Poitier and McNeil were nominated for Golden Globe Awards, and Petrie received a special "Gary Cooper Award" at the Cannes Film Festival.

Historical background

Experiences in this play echo a lawsuit, Hansberry v. Lee, 311 U.S. 32 (1940), to which the playwright Lorraine Hansberry's father was a party, when he fought to have his day in court despite the fact that a previous class action about racially motivated restrictive covenants, Burke v. Kleiman, 277 Ill. App. 519 (1934), had been similar to his situation. (This case was heard prior to the passage of the Fair Housing Act—Title VIII of the Civil Rights Act of 1968—which prohibited discrimination in housing). The Hansberry family won their right to be heard as a matter of due process of law in relation to the Fourteenth Amendment to the United States Constitution. The Supreme Court held that the Hansberry defendants were not bound by the Burke decision, because the class of homeowners in the Washington Park Subdivision had conflicting goals, and thus could not be considered to be the same class.  The plaintiff in the first action in 1934 was Olive Ida Burke, who brought the suit on behalf of a property owners' association to enforce racial restrictions. Her husband, James Burke, later sold a house to Carl Hansberry (Lorraine's father), when he changed his mind about the validity of the covenant. Mr. Burke's decision may have been motivated by the changing demographics of the neighborhood, but it was also influenced by the Depression. The demand for houses was so low among white buyers that Mr. Hansberry may have been the only prospective purchaser available.

Other versions

1973 musical 

A musical version of the play, Raisin, ran on Broadway from October 18, 1973, to December 7, 1975. The book of the musical, which stayed close to the play, was written by Hansberry's former husband, Robert Nemiroff. Music and lyrics were by Judd Woldin and Robert Brittan. The cast included Joe Morton (Walter Lee), Virginia Capers (Mama), Ernestine Jackson (Ruth), Debbie Allen (Beneatha) and Ralph Carter (Travis, the Youngers' young son). The show won the Tony Award for Best musical.

1989 TV film 
In 1989, the play was adapted into a TV film for PBS's American Playhouse series, starring Danny Glover (Walter Lee) and Esther Rolle (Mama), Kim Yancey (Beneatha), Starletta DuPois (Ruth), John Fiedler (Karl Lindner), and Helen Martin (Mrs. Johnson). This production received three Emmy Award nominations, but all were for technical categories. Bill Duke directed the production, while Chiz Schultz produced. This production was based on an off-Broadway revival produced by the Roundabout Theatre.

1996 BBC Radio play
On 3 March 1996, the BBC broadcast a production of the play by director/producer Claire Grove, with the following cast:

 Claire Benedict – Mama
 Ray Shell – Walter Lee
 Pat Bowie – Ruth
 Lachelle Carl – Beneatha
 Garren Givens – Travis
 Akim Mogaji – Joseph Asagai
 Ray Fearon – George Murchison
 John Sharion – Karl Lindner
 Dean Hill – Bobo

Broadway revival, 2004
A revival ran on Broadway at the Royale Theatre from April 26, 2004, to July 11, 2004 with the following cast:

Sean Combs – Walter Lee Younger
Audra McDonald – Ruth Younger
Phylicia Rashad – Lena Younger
Sanaa Lathan – Beneatha Younger
Bill Nunn – Bobo
David Aaron Baker – Karl Lindner
Lawrence Ballard – moving man
Teagle F. Bougere – Joseph Asagai
Frank Harts – George Murchison
Billy Eugene Jones – moving man
Alexander Mitchell – Travis Younger

The director was Kenny Leon, and David Binder and Vivek Tiwary were producers.

The play won two 2004 Tony Awards: Best Actress in a Play (Phylicia Rashad) and Best Featured Actress in a Play (Audra McDonald), and was nominated for Best Revival of a Play and Best Featured Actress in a Play (Sanaa Lathan).

2008 TV film 

In 2008, Sean Combs, Phylicia Rashad, Audra McDonald, and Sanaa Lathan reprised their roles from the 2004 Broadway revival in a television film directed by Kenny Leon. The film debuted at the 2008 Sundance Film Festival and was broadcast by ABC on February 25, 2008. Rashad and McDonald received Emmy nominations for their portrayals of Lena and Ruth. According to Nielsen Media Research, the program was watched by 12.7 million viewers and ranked No. 9 in the ratings for the week ending March 2, 2008.

Royal Exchange, Manchester production, 2010
In 2010, Michael Buffong directed a widely acclaimed production at the Royal Exchange Theatre in Manchester, described by Dominic Cavendish in The Daily Telegraph as "A brilliant play, brilliantly served". Michael Buffong, Ray Fearon and Jenny Jules all won MEN Awards. The cast were:
Jenny Jules – Ruth Younger
Ray Fearon – Walter Lee Younger
Tracy Ifeachor – Beneatha Younger
Starletta DuPois (who played Ruth in the 1989 film) – Lena Younger
Damola Adelaja – Joseph Asagai
Simon Combs – George Murchison
Tom Hodgkins – Karl Lindner
Ray Emmet Brown – Bobo/Moving Man

Broadway revival, 2014
A second revival ran on Broadway from April 3, 2014, to June 15, 2014, at the Ethel Barrymore Theatre. The play won three 2014 Tony Awards: Best Revival of a Play, Best Performance by an Actress in a Featured Role in a Play (Sophie Okonedo) and Best Direction of a Play (Kenny Leon).

Denzel Washington – Walter Lee Younger
Sophie Okonedo – Ruth Younger
LaTanya Richardson Jackson – Lena Younger
Anika Noni Rose – Beneatha Younger
Stephen McKinley Henderson – Bobo
David Cromer – Karl Lindner
Keith Eric Chappelle – moving man
Sean Patrick Thomas – Joseph Asagai
Jason Dirden – George Murchison
Billy Eugene Jones – moving man
Bryce Clyde Jenkins – Travis Younger

2016 BBC Radio Play
On 31 January 2016 the BBC broadcast a new production of the play by director/producer Pauline Harris. This version restores the character of Mrs Johnson and a number of scenes that were cut from the Broadway production and subsequent film, with the following cast:

Danny Sapani – Walter Lee Younger
Dona Croll – Lena Younger
Nadine Marshall – Ruth Younger
Lenora Crichlow – Beneatha Younger
Segun Fawole – Travis Younger
Jude Akwudike – Bobo/Asagai
Cecilia Noble – Mrs. Johnson
Sean Baker – Karl Lindner
Richard Pepple – George Murchison

Arena Stage revival, 2017
The play opened on April 6, 2017, at Arena Stage in Washington, D.C., directed by Tazewell Thompson, with the following cast:

Will Cobbs – Walter Lee Younger
Lizan Mitchell – Lena Younger
Dawn Ursula – Ruth Younger
Joy Jones – Beneatha Younger
Jeremiah Hasty – Travis Younger
Mack Leamon – Bobo/Asagai
Thomas Adrian Simpson – Karl Lindner
Keith L. Royal Smith – George Murchison

The Raisin Cycle
The 2010 Bruce Norris play Clybourne Park depicts the white family that sold the house to the Youngers. The first act takes place just before the events of A Raisin in the Sun, involving the selling of the house to the Black family; the second act takes place 50 years later.

The 2013 play by Kwame Kwei-Armah entitled Beneatha's Place follows Beneatha after she leaves with Asagai to Nigeria and, instead of becoming a doctor, becomes the Dean of Social Sciences at a respected (unnamed) California university.

The two above plays, together with the original, were referred to by Kwei-Armah as "The Raisin Cycle" and were produced together by Baltimore's Center Stage in the 2012–2013 season.

See also

 Civil rights movement in popular culture

References

External links

 
 
 Listen to the play online
 EDSITEment's lesson Raisin in the Sun the Quest for the American Dream
 Text to Text: ‘'A Raisin in the Sun'’ and ‘'Discrimination in Housing Against Nonwhites Persists Quietly'’ from The New York Times

1959 plays
African-American plays
Chicago in fiction
Civil rights movement in popular culture
Domestic tragedies
Plays about race and ethnicity
American plays adapted into films
Plays by Lorraine Hansberry
Plays set in Illinois
Tony Award-winning plays